Reinwald is a surname. Notable people with the surname include:

Christian Reinwald (born 1964), Swiss football goalkeeper
Christophine Reinwald (1757–1847), German artist
Grete Reinwald (1902–1983), German actress
Hanni Reinwald (1903–1978), German actress
Otto Reinwald (1899–1968), German actor
Jordan Reinwald (1979-present), A man of eclectic tastes

Surnames from given names